Amandine Lhote (born 22 December 1986) is a French canoeist. She competed in the women's K-4 500 metres event at the 2016 Summer Olympics.

References

External links
 
 

1986 births
Living people
French female canoeists
Olympic canoeists of France
Canoeists at the 2016 Summer Olympics
Canoeists at the 2015 European Games
European Games competitors for France
People from Cambrai
Sportspeople from Nord (French department)